Aban is a Persian surname, from the Arabic إبان. It is also a given name. Notable people with the name include:

Surname
 Gonzalo Abán (born 1987), Argentine footballer
 Aaron Aban, Filipino basketball player

Given name
 Aban ibn Uthman, one of the Tabi'un and son of Uthman
 Aban Marker Kabraji, Pakistani biologist and academic
 Aban Elias
 Aban ibn Taghlib, Shia scholar, Quranic reciter
 Aban ibn abi-Ayyash